Scope creep (also called requirement creep, or kitchen sink syndrome) in project management refers to changes, continuous or uncontrolled growth in a project’s scope, at any point after the project begins. This can occur when the scope of a project is not properly defined, documented, or controlled. It is generally considered harmful. It is related to but distinct from feature creep, because feature creep refers to features, and scope creep refers to the whole project.

Common causes

Poorly defined project scope 
Ineffective project management communication between a client and the project manager is a leading effect of project scope creep. An assignment that is not understood correctly will turn out to be completely different from clients vision. With that being said clients can also be to blame as they may not see a clear vision of what they want.

Failure to capture all requirements 
Properly defining project scope requires thorough investigation by the project manager during the initial planning phase of a project. Failure to gather all information from all relevant stakeholders is a common reason for incomplete scope statements and missing requirements, which can frequently and easily lead to scope creep later in the project. It is essential that everyone on the team understands the project requirements thoroughly -- and that the project sponsor and relevant stakeholders have signed off on those requirements -- before execution of the project begins.

Lack of project management practices 
Adoptions and adhering to project management practices and project management processes are confirmed methods of preventing scope creep from dismantling the project.

Addition of unnecessary features 
Sometimes project teams tend to start adding additional features in order to impress the client. This may not work and tend to cause more work for such project and throw off the scope.

The communication gap between project stakeholders 
Another huge cause of scope creep is the communication gap between the stakeholders. Clients may not respond quickly enough to the project managers causing the project to run into a bottleneck.

These aspects can affect the operational efficiencies of companies, especially when involved in long-term relationships. Scope creep is a risk in most projects. Most megaprojects fall victim to scope creep (see Megaprojects and Risk). Scope creep often results in cost overrun. A "value for free" strategy is difficult to counteract and remains a difficult challenge for even the most experienced project managers.

See also

 Anti-pattern
 Cost overrun
 Scope (project management)
 Planning poker
 Escalation of commitment
 Instruction creep
 Mission creep
 The Mythical Man-Month
 Second-system effect
 Software bloat

References

Project management